Paul Alain Leclerc (born 4 October 1947), known by his stage name Julien Clerc, is a French singer-songwriter.

Life
Born in Paris, Clerc grew up listening to classical music in his father Paul Leclerc's home, while his mother Évelyne Merlot introduced him to the music of such singers as Georges Brassens and Edith Piaf. He began to learn the piano at six, and by 13, started to play by ear everything he heard on the radio.

During his secondary school and university days, he met Maurice Vallet and Etienne Roda-Gil, two of his main songwriters, and began to compose his first songs. He changed his name to Julien Clerc upon signing a contract with Pathé Marconi, releasing his first album in May 1968.

The album went on to win the Académie Charles Cros Record Award. In 1969, Clerc went on the Olympia stage for the first time to open for Gilbert Becaud's concert. Despite having been in show business for only one year, his performance was a great success. He would later return repeatedly to the Olympia for a series of concerts.

From May 1969 to February 1970, he starred in the highly successful Paris run of the musical Hair, which increased his profile.

By the age of 24, Clerc was a major star and had recorded numerous hits, many of which were sold abroad, translated and distributed in other languages.

In 1979, he took part in two new collaborative ventures, singing the title song of the children's musical, "Emilie Jolie" and participating in "36 Front Populaire", a double album musical about a turbulent historical period. Over the years, Clerc's repertoire has ranged from his own compositions to classic French songs like "Comme Hier" by Brassens and "L'hymne à l'amour" by Edith Piaf. He has performed in Africa, the Americas and Europe.

In January 1999, Clerc went on stage at the Théâtre des Champs-Elysées and delivered an unplugged acoustic set that was a long way from the rock/pop-based shows that he had been giving his audience for some years. In 2000, he appeared, along with many other artists, in a number of benefit concerts for Restaurants du Coeur, a winter food bank charity.

In 2003, Clerc recorded a new album of classic American "standards", in French. On another front, Clerc was named UNHCR Goodwill Ambassador at a ceremony in Paris in November 2003 after working for nearly two years with the agency on various benevolent projects for refugees. In March 2004, he undertook his first field mission to meet with refugees and aid workers in Chad. His mission was documented by Envoyé spécial and was broadcast on a national French TV channel in April 2004.

Family
Clerc has five children: daughters Angèle (adopted) and Jeanne Herry with French actress Miou-Miou; daughter Vanille and son Barnabé with then-wife Virginie Coupérie; and son Léonard with Hélène Grémillon, whom he married in 2012.

Awards
 1974: Five golden records

Discography

Albums and Singles

 1970: Julien Clerc - Premier Album
 1970: Des jours entiers à t'aimer
 1971: Julien Clerc
 1971: Olympia 70
 1971: Niagara
 1972: Liberté, égalité, fraternité ... ou la mort

 1973: Ca fait pleurer le bon dieu
 1974: Terre de France
 1974: N°7
 1976: A mon âge et à l'heure qu'il est
 1978: Jaloux
 1979: 36 Front populaire (comédie musicale)
 1980: Quand je joue

 1980: Sans entracte

 1982: Femmes, indiscrétion, blasphème

 1984: Aime-moi
 1987: Les aventures à l'eau
 1990: Fais-moi une place

 1992: Utile

 1994: Julien

 2000: Si j'étais elle

 2003: Studio (album de reprise 13 titres)
 2005: Double enfance

 2008: Où s'en vont les avions ?
 2009: Tour 09 (live)
 2011: Fou, Peut-être
 2011: Hôtel des Caravelles (single)
 2012: Le temps d'aimee (single)
 2012: Symphonique - À l'Opéra national de Paris - Palais Garnier (live)
 2014: Partout la musique vient
 2014: On ne se méfie jamais assez (single)
 2016: Entre elle et moi (single)
 2016: Fans, je vous aime (single)
 2017: À nos amours 
 2021: Terrien
 2021: Les Jours Heureux
Cooperation in
 1979: Emilie Jolie by Philippe Chatel

References

External links

 Official website
 www.julienclerc.eu

1947 births
Living people
French people of Guadeloupean descent
Musicians from Paris
French singer-songwriters
United Nations High Commissioner for Refugees Goodwill Ambassadors
Lycée Lakanal alumni
Pathé-Marconi artists
Commandeurs of the Ordre des Arts et des Lettres
People named in the Paradise Papers